The Shafallah Center, or Shafallah Center for Children with Special Needs, is a Qatar-based organization founded in 1999 for the welfare of people with intellectual disabilities, mainly autism spectrum disorders. The center provides health services and special care. Additionally, Shafallah has education centers, and signs agreements with local firms in order to help its graduates secure jobs.

History
Shafallah Center was established in 1999.

Activities
An annual forum focusing on global issues affecting people with disabilities is organized by the Shafallah Center. Called the Annual Shafallah Forum, topics of discussion at the forum include the difficulties faced by refugees and children with autism spectrum disorders in developing countries, and methods to alleviate these difficulties. Several world leaders have attended past editions.

Autism research is conducted at the organization's Medical Genetic Center. Shafallah has also conducted genome sequencing as a research tool on a local scale.

In October 2015, Shafallah saw its first-ever batch of students graduate. The graduation class had 189 students.

Partnerships
Shafallah Center is partnered with American organization Autism Speaks. In December 2014, Shafallah signed an agreement with Qatar Airways in order to provide preferential employment opportunities for individuals with intellectual abilities. This resulted in a minimum of 25 members of Shafallah being employed by the airline.

References

Disability organisations based in Qatar
Medical and health organisations based in Qatar
Educational organisations based in Qatar
Autism-related organizations
1999 establishments in Qatar
Organizations established in 1999